The Sangarskaya Svita is an Early Cretaceous geologic formation in Russia. Dinosaur remains from the Ankylosauridae are among the fossils that have been recovered from the formation, although none have yet been referred to a specific genus.

Paleofauna
Ankylosauridae indet

See also

 List of dinosaur-bearing rock formations
 List of stratigraphic units with indeterminate dinosaur fossils

References

Geologic formations of Russia
Mesozoic Erathem of Asia